Dean McIntosh, known professionally as Arrow Benjamin, is an English singer and songwriter. He is known for collaborating with Naughty Boy and Beyoncé on the track "Runnin' (Lose It All)". Benjamin also co-wrote and performed backing vocals on the song "Freedom" for Beyoncé's 2016 album Lemonade. Benjamin has also written songs for artists such as Major Lazer, Rudimental and Labrinth. He released his debut solo single, "Look at Me", on 16 October 2016.

Discography

Extended plays

Singles

References

External links
 

21st-century Black British male singers
British contemporary R&B singers
English male singer-songwriters
Island Records artists
Living people
People from Brixton
Singers from London
Virgin Records artists
English people of Jamaican descent
Year of birth missing (living people)